Platyptilia euridactyla is a moth of the family Pterophoridae. It is found in Russia and China (Manchuria).

References

Moths described in 1976
euridactyla